20,000 Streets Under the Sky is an album by the band Marah, released in 2004.

Track listing

Personnel
 Mike Ambs: Drums
 David Bielanko: Banjo, Bass, Guitar, Vocals
 Serge Bielanko: Guitar, Harmonica, Vocals
 Mark Boyce: Organ, Piano, Clavinet
 Matt Cappy: Trumpet
 Kirk Henderson: Keyboards, Background Vocals
 Nancy Falkow: Background Vocals
 Mike Hood: Trombone
 Jamie Mahon: Bass
 Jon Wurster: Drums
 The Shalitas: Background Vocals

References

 

2004 albums
Marah (band) albums
Yep Roc Records albums